The 2022 National League Division Series (NLDS) were the two best-of-five playoff series in Major League Baseball (MLB) to determine the participating teams of the 2022 National League Championship Series (NLCS). These matchups were:

(1) Los Angeles Dodgers (NL West champions) vs. (5) San Diego Padres
(2) Atlanta Braves (NL East champions) vs. (6) Philadelphia Phillies

The Division Series saw both top seeds lose in the round for the third time in four years.

Background

The first two seeds are determined by regular season winning percentages. The final two teams are the winner of the National League Wild Card Series, played between the league's third to sixth-seeded teams.

The Los Angeles Dodgers (111–51) clinched the National League West on September 14, a first-round bye from the National League Wild Card Series on September 19, the 1 seed in the National League on September 25, and the best record on September 30, earning them home-field advantage throughout the entire playoffs. The Dodgers are making their tenth straight postseason appearance with 111 wins, which is the third longest streak and fourth most in MLB history. They played against the San Diego Padres (89–73), who clinched their first division series appearance since 2020 and just their second since 2006 by defeating the New York Mets in three games in the Wild Card Series. During the regular season, the Dodgers went 14–5 versus the Padres. The Padres defeated the Dodgers in four games and advanced to the National League Championship Series for the first time since 1998.

The Atlanta Braves (101–61) clinched the National League East and first-round bye on October 4, the second-to-last day of the season. The Braves had trailed the New York Mets for virtually the whole season, but they eventually overtook them on the last weekend of the season via a three-game sweep of New York Mets at Truist Park, winning the season series 10–9. The Braves made their fifth straight postseason appearance and are looking to become the first repeat champions since the 2000 New York Yankees, and played against the Philadelphia Phillies (87–75), who clinched their first division series berth and appearance since 2011 by defeating the St. Louis Cardinals in a two-game sweep in the Wild Card Series. Atlanta went 11–8 during the season series against Philadelphia. The Phillies defeated the Braves in four games and advanced to the National League Championship Series for the first time since 2010.

Matchups

Los Angeles Dodgers vs. San Diego Padres

Atlanta Braves vs. Philadelphia Phillies

Los Angeles vs. San Diego
This was the second postseason meeting between Los Angeles and San Diego, following their 2020 National League Division Series match-up, which was won by Los Angeles in a three-game sweep. During the regular season, the Dodgers finished in first place in the National League West, while the Padres finished 22 games back in second place. This is a continuation of the Dodgers–Padres rivalry, which has heated up in recent years.

Game 1

Julio Urías made his first career postseason Game 1 start for the Dodgers against Mike Clevinger of the Padres. Trea Turner homered in the first to give the Dodgers an early lead, which they added to quickly, scoring five runs off Clevinger in  innings. The Padres came back to score three runs in the fifth inning to tighten the game, including a Wil Myers home run It remained scoreless the rest of the way and the Dodgers won the first game, 5–3.

Game 2

Game 2 marked Yu Darvish's first postseason start at Dodger Stadium since he started for the Dodgers in Game 7 of the 2017 World Series, which the Dodgers lost to the Houston Astros. Injured Dodgers pitcher Walker Buehler threw out the ceremonial first pitch.
Clayton Kershaw started for the Dodgers. Manny Machado and Freddie Freeman each hit solo home runs in the first inning. Los Angeles took the lead the next inning on a solo homer by Max Muncy, but the Padres regained it in the third inning, thanks to a Machado double, scoring Ha-Seong Kim, and a Jake Cronenworth ground out, scoring Juan Soto. The game was tied up again in the bottom of the inning, when Trea Turner hit a solo home run. San Diego took the lead again when Jurickson Profar singled to right field off of reliever Brusdar Graterol, scoring Cronenworth and making it 4–3, right after Turner had botched what would have been an inning-ending double play. The lead would have been bigger if not for an improbable barehanded play by Graterol to get Wil Myers out at home, thwarting a bunt attempt by Trent Grisham.

The Dodgers were close to scoring many times during the rest of the game, but ultimately they did not capitalize. In the bottom of the sixth, with baserunners on the corners and nobody out, Robert Suarez relieved Darvish and proceeded to strike out Justin Turner, then induced an inning-ending double play to keep the Dodgers out of the scoreboard. In the bottom of the seventh, Los Angeles had the bases loaded but scored no runs. In the top of the eighth, Cronenworth hit a home run that made it 5–3 San Diego. Padres closer Josh Hader earned a four-out save, his first in more than two years, as he kept the game scoreless the rest of the way. The Padres won to even up the series at a game apiece, in what was their first win against the Dodgers in the postseason.

Game 3

In Petco Park's first playoff game before fans since 2006 National League Division Series, Tony Gonsolin started for the Dodgers, while Blake Snell started for the Padres. The Padres took the early lead in the bottom of the first inning, as Jake Cronenworth drove in Juan Soto from second base. Gonsolin lasted only  innings after a shaky start. Trent Grisham hit a solo home run off of Andrew Heaney to double the lead in the fourth, and the Dodgers cut the lead back to one with a Mookie Betts sacrifice fly in the top of the fifth. San Diego did not record any hits since the bottom of the fourth, but its bullpen held the Dodgers scoreless, including Josh Hader with his second save in a row. The Dodgers finished the game 0-for-9 with runners in scoring position, including a bases-loaded jam in the third where they came up emptyhanded. With the win, the Padres took a 2–1 series lead, their first in the National League Division Series since 1998, and their first of the season against LA after playing at least two games.

Game 4

Game 4 commenced following a 31-minute rain delay, Tyler Anderson started for Los Angeles while Joe Musgrove started for San Diego. Former Padres pitcher Jake Peavy threw out the ceremonial first pitch.

Musgrove worked around a Freddie Freeman double in the first when Trent Grisham made a ranging catch of a fly ball to end the inning. Tyler Anderson then worked around a Manny Machado single in the bottom of the inning. The top of the third inning would see the game's first action, with runners on second and third and one out, Freeman's two-run double gave the Dodgers the first runs of the game. In the top of the seventh, the Dodgers loaded the bases against the Padres bullpen with no outs, but only scored one run on a Will Smith sacrifice fly. Tim Hill retired the next two batters to prevent further damage. In the bottom of the seventh inning, the Padres took the lead with a five-run inning against Tommy Kahnle, Yency Almonte, and Alex Vesia. With no outs, Austin Nola drove in the Padres' first run with an infield single against Kahnle. After the Dodgers pitching change to Almonte, Ha-seong Kim doubled in a run and a single by Juan Soto tied the game at 3. Almonte then retired the next two Padres. With Jake Cronenworth at the plate, Soto proceeded to steal second and Dodgers' manager Dave Roberts changed pitchers and brought Vesia into the game. Cronenworth then singled to center plating Kim and Soto to give the Padres a 5–3 lead. Robert Suárez pitched a scoreless eighth inning for the Padres and closer Josh Hader struck out the top of the order to end the series.

With the win, the 89-win Padres completed the upset of the 111-win Dodgers in four games. The only other time in MLB playoff history that a team defeated an opponent who was more than 22 wins better was in the 1906 World Series when the 93-win Chicago White Sox defeated the 116-win Chicago Cubs. The Padres advanced to the NLCS for the first time since 1998.

Atlanta vs. Philadelphia
This was the second postseason meeting between Philadelphia and Atlanta, following their 1993 National League Championship Series match-up, which was won by Philadelphia in six games. During the regular season, the Braves finished in first place in the National League East, while the Phillies finished 14 games back in third place.

Game 1

The first matchup of the series featured Ranger Suárez for the Phillies going against Max Fried for the Braves. Philadelphia jumped out to an immediate 2-0 lead on a pair of RBI singles by Nick Castellanos and Alec Bohm. The Braves got on the board with a solo home run by Travis d'Arnaud to lead off the second, but the Phillies answered back in the third with a Bohm sacrifice fly and a Jean Segura RBI single. Castellanos tacked on two more runs in the fourth with a bases loaded single and Edmundo Sosa drove in another on a sacrifice fly in the fifth to push the game to a 7–1 lead. Neither starter made it out of the fourth inning as the bullpens for both teams took over. d'Arnaud continued his fine day with a two-run double in the bottom of the fifth to get Atlanta back in the game as both bullpens held through the ninth. Atlanta threatened a comeback as Matt Olson launched a three-run homer to bring the game within one, but Castellanos made a game-saving catch in right field and Zach Eflin induced a d'Arnaud groundout to seal a thrilling Game 1 victory for the Phillies.

Game 2

Game 2 was delayed by 2 hours and 55 minutes due to rain.

20-game winner Kyle Wright went up against Zack Wheeler in Game 2 as the Braves looked to even up the series. Both pitchers looked sharp as they both cruised through five scoreless innings, but Atlanta broke through with three runs on three straight singles by Matt Olson, Austin Riley, and Travis d'Arnaud in the sixth. Wright finished his night with no runs and six strikeouts over six innings while Wheeler was tagged for three runs and five strikeouts over six. The Braves bullpen would shut down the Phillies for the last three innings as Kenley Jansen finished off the game with a perfect ninth to even the series 1-1.

Game 3

Spencer Strider squared off against Aaron Nola in the first postseason game in Philadelphia since 2011. After a quiet first two innings the Phillies offense exploded for six runs in the third. Bryson Stott got the scoring started with an RBI double before Strider intentionally walked Kyle Schwarber to get to Rhys Hoskins who was 1-for-19 with 7 strikeouts in the postseason thus far. Hoskins crushed the first pitch for a three-run homer and spiked his bat in celebration as the Phillies grabbed a 4-0 lead. Strider wouldn't make it out of the inning, getting pulled after another hit by J.T. Realmuto ended his night with  innings pitched. Dylan Lee came on in relief and, with the first pitch he threw, gave up a two-run homer to Bryce Harper to extend the lead to 6-0. Michael Harris II would drive in Braves' only run in the sixth with an RBI single, but Nola would close out the inning and finish his night with one run and six strikeouts over six innings. The Phillies would score three more in the seventh with a Harper RBI double and a two-run single from Nick Castellanos and Connor Brogdon slammed the door with a perfect ninth to give the Phillies a 2-1 series lead.

Game 4

The Braves turned to Charlie Morton, who owned a 5-0 record and 0.73 ERA in elimination games, to save their season and force a Game 5 as the Phillies would tab midseason acquisition Noah Syndergaard to end it. Once again, the Phillies offense got started early as Brandon Marsh crushed a three-run home run in the second off of Morton after he was hit in the elbow on a line-drive by Alec Bohm. Orlando Arcia responded with a solo home run in the third to get the Braves on the board, but J.T. Realmuto would answer with an inside-the-park home run, the first in the postseason by a catcher, off of Collin McHugh who came on in relief of the injured Morton. Matt Olson would cut the lead in half with a solo homer in the fourth, but Phillies would break the game open with three consecutive RBI singles off the bats of Rhys Hoskins, Realmuto, and Bryce Harper in the sixth inning. Travis d'Arnaud hit a solo homer in the seventh, but that would be the last time Atlanta would score as the Phillies bullpen pitched a clean eighth and ninth, punctuated by a Bryce Harper solo homer in the eighth. With the win, the 87-win Phillies defeated the 101-win and defending World Series champion Braves to advance to the National League Championship Series for the first time since 2010.

See also
2022 American League Division Series

References

External links
Major League Baseball postseason schedule

Division Series
National League Division Series
National League Division Series
Los Angeles Dodgers postseason
Atlanta Braves postseason
San Diego Padres postseason
Philadelphia Phillies postseason
National League Division Series
National League Division Series
National League Division Series
National League Division Series
National League Division Series
National League Division Series